Joseph Vernon "Big Joe" Turner Jr. (May 18, 1911 – November 24, 1985) was an American singer from Kansas City, Missouri. According to songwriter Doc Pomus, "Rock and roll would have never happened without him." His greatest fame was due to his rock-and-roll recordings in the 1950s, particularly "Shake, Rattle and Roll", but his career as a performer endured from the 1920s into the 1980s.

Turner was inducted into the Rock and Roll Hall of Fame in 1987, with the Hall lauding him as "the brawny voiced 'Boss of the Blues.

Career

Early days
Turner was born May 18, 1911, in Kansas City, Missouri, United States. His father was killed in a train accident when Turner was four years old. He sang in his church, and on street corners for money. He left school at age fourteen to work in Kansas City's nightclubs, first as a cook and later as a singing bartender. He became known as "The Singing Barman", and worked in such venues as the Kingfish Club and the Sunset, where he and his partner, the boogie-woogie pianist Pete Johnson, became resident performers. The Sunset was managed by Piney Brown. It featured "separate but equal" facilities for white patrons. Turner wrote "Piney Brown Blues" in his honor and sang it throughout his career.

At that time Kansas City nightclubs were subject to frequent raids by the police; Turner said, "The Boss man would have his bondsmen down at the police station before we got there. We'd walk in, sign our names and walk right out. Then we would cabaret until morning."

His partnership with Johnson proved fruitful. Together they went to New York City in 1936, where they appeared on a playbill with Benny Goodman, but as Turner recounted, "After our show with Goodman, we auditioned at several places, but New York wasn't ready for us yet, so we headed back to K.C." Eventually they were seen by the talent scout John Hammond in 1938, who invited them back to New York to appear in one of his From Spirituals to Swing concerts at Carnegie Hall, which were instrumental in introducing jazz and blues to a wider American audience.

In part because of their appearance at Carnegie Hall, Turner and Johnson had a major success with the song "Roll 'Em Pete". The track was basically a collection of traditional blues lyrics. It was a song that Turner recorded many times, with various musicians, over the ensuing years.

1939 to 1950
In 1939, along with the boogie-woogie pianists Albert Ammons and Meade Lux Lewis, Turner and Johnson began a residency at Café Society, a nightclub in New York City, where they appeared on the same playbill as Billie Holiday and Frankie Newton's band. Besides "Roll 'Em, Pete", Turner's best-known recordings from this period are probably "Cherry Red", "I Want a Little Girl" and "Wee Baby Blues". "Cherry Red" was recorded in 1939 for the Vocalion label, with Hot Lips Page on trumpet and a full band in attendance. During the next year Turner contracted with Decca and recorded "Piney Brown Blues" with Johnson on piano.

In 1941, he went to Los Angeles and performed in Duke Ellington's revue Jump for Joy in Hollywood. He appeared as a singing policeman in a comedy sketch, "He's on the Beat". Los Angeles was his home for a time, and during 1944 he worked in Meade Lux Lewis's Soundies musical movies. He sang on the soundtrack recordings but was not present for filming, and his vocals were mouthed by the comedian Dudley Dickerson for the camera. In 1945 Turner and Pete Johnson established the Blue Moon Club, a bar in Los Angeles.

In 1945, he also signed a recording contract with National Records, for which he recorded under the supervision of Herb Abramson. His first hit single was a cover of Saunders King's "S.K. Blues" (1945). He recorded the songs "My Gal's a Jockey" and the risqué "Around the Clock" the same year, and Aladdin Records released "Battle of the Blues", a duet with Wynonie Harris. Turner stayed with National until 1947, but none of his recordings were big sellers. In 1950, he recorded the song "Still in the Dark", released by Freedom Records. Joe Turner also played at the Cavalcades of Jazz concert held at Wrigley Field in Los Angeles which was produced by Leon Hefflin Sr. on September 23, 1945, to a crowd of 15,000.  Count Basie, the Honeydrippers, The Peters Sisters, Slim and Bam and Valaida Snow were also featured artists. Turner also performed in 1948 alongside Dizzy Gillespie at the fourth famed annual Cavalcade of Jazz concert held at Wrigley Field in Los Angeles which on September 12.  Also on the program that day were Frankie Laine, The Sweethearts of Rhythm, The Honeydrippers, Little Miss Cornshucks, Jimmy Witherspoon, The Blenders, and The Sensations.

Turner was a significant figure in the development of Rhythm and Blues. According to the Rock & Roll Hall of Fame, Turner and Louis Jordan laid the foundation for R&B in the 1940s, cutting one swinging rhythm & blues masterpiece after another".

Turner made many albums with Johnson, Art Tatum, Sammy Price, and other jazz groups. He recorded for several record companies. He also performed with the Count Basie Orchestra. During his career, Turner was part of the transition from big bands to jump blues to rhythm and blues to rock and roll. He was a master of traditional blues verses, and at Kansas City jam sessions he could swap choruses with instrumental soloists for hours.

Success during the 1950s

In 1951, while performing with the Count Basie Orchestra at Harlem's Apollo Theater as a replacement for Jimmy Rushing, he was spotted by Ahmet and Nesuhi Ertegun, who contracted him to their new recording company, Atlantic Records. Turner recorded a number of successes for them, including the blues standards, "Chains of Love" and "Sweet Sixteen". Many of his vocals are punctuated with shouts to the band members, as in "Boogie Woogie Country Girl" ("That's a good rockin' band!", "Go ahead, man! Ow! That's just what I need!" ) and "Honey Hush" (he repeatedly sings, "Hi-yo, Silver!", a famous command used by the Lone Ranger on his popular radio show, to his horse named Silver). Turner's records reached the top of the rhythm-and-blues charts. Some of his songs were so risqué that some radio stations refused to play them, but they received much play on jukeboxes and records.

Turner had great success during 1954 with "Shake, Rattle and Roll", which significantly boosted his career, turning him into a teenage favorite, and also helped to transform popular music. During the song, Turner yells at his woman to "get outta that bed, wash yo' face an' hands" and comments that she's "wearin' those dresses, the sun comes shinin' through! I can't believe my eyes, all that mess belongs to you." He sang it on film for the 1955 theatrical feature Rhythm and Blues Revue.

Although the cover version of the song by Bill Haley & His Comets, with the risqué lyrics partly omitted, was a greater sales success, many listeners sought out Turner's version and were introduced thereby to rhythm and blues. Elvis Presley's version of "Shake, Rattle and Roll" combined Turner's lyrics with Haley's arrangement, but was not a successful single.

"The Chicken and the Hawk", "Flip, Flop and Fly", "Hide and Seek", "Morning, Noon and Night", and "Well All Right" were successful recordings from this period. He performed on the television program Showtime at the Apollo and in the movie Shake Rattle & Rock! (1956).

The song "Corrine, Corrina" was another great seller during 1956. In addition to the rock music songs, he released Boss of the Blues album in 1956. "(I'm Gonna) Jump for Joy", his last hit, reached the US R&B record chart on May 26, 1958.

He toured Australia in 1957 with Lee Gordon's Big Show sharing the bill with Bill Haley and the Comets, LaVern Baker and Freddie Bell and the Bellboys.

Returning to the blues
After a number of successes in this vein, Turner quit popular music and resumed singing with small jazz combos, recording numerous albums in that style during the 1960s and 1970s. in 1966, Bill Haley helped revive Turner's career by lending him the Comets for a series of popular recordings for the Orfeón label in Mexico. In 1977 he recorded a cover version of Guitar Slim's song, "The Things That I Used to Do".

During the 1960s and 1970s he resumed performing jazz and blues music, performing at many music festivals and recording for Norman Granz's Pablo Records. He also worked with Axel Zwingenberger. Turner also participated in a "Battle of the Blues" with Wynonie Harris and T-Bone Walker.

In 1965, he toured in England with the trumpeter Buck Clayton and the trombonist Vic Dickenson, accompanied by Humphrey Lyttelton and his band. Part of a studio concert was televised by the BBC and later issued on DVD. A sound recording of a club appearance made during this tour is not thought of sufficient sound quality to justify commercial issue. He also toured Europe with Count Basie and his orchestra.

He won the Esquire magazine award for male vocalist in 1945, the Melody Maker award for best "new" vocalist of 1956, and the British Jazz Journal award as top male singer of 1965. In 1977, Turner recorded "I'm Gonna Sit Right Down and Write Myself a Letter" for Spivey Records, with Lloyd Glenn on piano. Turner's career endured from the barrooms of Kansas City in the 1920s (when at the age of twelve he performed with a pencilled moustache and his father's hat) to European jazz festivals of the 1980s.

In 1983, two years before his death, Turner was inducted into the Blues Hall of Fame. That same year, the album Blues Train was released by Mute Records; the album featured Turner with the band Roomful of Blues. Turner received top billing with Count Basie in the Kansas City jazz reunion movie The Last of the Blue Devils (1979), featuring Jay McShann, Jimmy Forrest, and other players from the city.

Death
Turner died of heart failure in November 1985, at the age of 74, in Inglewood, California, having suffered from effects of arthritis, a stroke and diabetes. His funeral included musical tributes from Etta James and Barbara Morrison. He was buried at Roosevelt Memorial Park in Gardena, California.

He was posthumously inducted into the Rock and Roll Hall of Fame in 1987.

Tributes
The New York Times music critic Robert Palmer wrote of "his voice, pushing like a Count Basie solo, rich and grainy as a section of saxophones, which dominated the room with the sheer sumptuousness of its sound." In announcing Turner's death, the British music magazine NME, in its December 1985 issue, described him as "the grandfather of rock and roll".

According to the Blues Hall of Fame, Turner "was a king of the jump blues genre, a boogie woogie belter, progenitor of rhythm & blues and rock ‘n’ roll, and a respected performer in jazz circles.

Dave Alvin wrote a song about an evening he spent with Turner, entitled "Boss of the Blues", for his 2009 album, Dave Alvin and the Guilty Women. Alvin discussed the song in issue 59 of the Blasters Newsletter. Alvin later collaborated with his brother and former Blaster Phil Alvin on a second reunion album, Lost Time, released in 2015, containing four covers of songs by Turner, including "Cherry Red", "Wee Baby Blues" and "Hide and Seek". The brothers met Turner in Los Angeles, where he was playing in clubs on Central Avenue and living in the Adams district between tours in the 1960s. Phil Alvin opened for Turner a few times with his first band, Delta Pacific. Turner continued mentoring the Alvin brothers until his death in 1985. He is pictured on the back cover of Lost Time.

The biographical film The Buddy Holly Story refers to Turner and his contemporaries Little Richard and Fats Domino as major influences on Holly, who is portrayed collecting their vinyl recordings.

Most famous recordings
 "Roll 'Em Pete" (1938), available in many versions over the years; used in the million-dollar opening scene of Spike Lee's 1992 film Malcolm X
 "Chains of Love" * (1951), Turner's first million-seller, written by Ahmet Ertegun under the pseudonym Nugetre for the lyrics and Vann "Piano Man" Walls for the music, reaching the million sales mark by 1954
 "Honey Hush" * (1953), Turner's second million-seller, written by Turner but credited to Lou Willie Turner
 "Shake, Rattle and Roll" (1954), written by Charles Calhoun, i. e. Jesse Stone's songwriting name 
 "Flip, Flop and Fly" * (1955), sold a million copies over the years; written by Charles Calhoun and Turner but credited to Lou Willie Turner
 "Cherry Red" (1956)
 "Corrine, Corrina" * (1956), his fourth million-seller, with adaption by J. Mayo Williams, Mitchell Parish and Bo Chatmon in 1932; reached number 41 and spent 10 weeks on the Billboard record chart
 "Wee Baby Blues" (1956), a song Turner had been singing since his Kingfish Club days
 "Love Roller Coaster" (1956), with new lyrics to the Kansas City classic "Morning Glory"
 "Midnight Special" (1957)

Tracks marked with an asterisk were million-selling records.

Discography

Albums
 Joe Turner Sings Kansas City Jazz (Decca, 1953)
 Joe Turner and Pete Johnson (EmArcy, 1955)
 The Boss of the Blues Sings Kansas City Jazz (Atlantic, 1956)
 Rock & Roll (Atlantic, 1957)
 Rockin' the Blues (Atlantic, 1958)
 Big Joe Is Here (Atlantic, 1959)
 Big Joe Rides Again (Atlantic, 1960)
 Jumpin' the Blues with Pete Johnson (Arhoolie, 1962)
 Joe Turner and Jimmy Nelson (Crown, 1963)
 Sings The Blues Vol. I (Oriole, 1964)
 Sings The Blues Vol. II (Oriole, 1965)
 Singing the Blues (BluesWay, 1967)
 The Real Boss of the Blues (BluesTime, 1969)
 Super Black Blues (BluesTime, 1969) with T-Bone Walker and Otis Spann
 Turns On the Blues (Kent, 1970)
 Texas Style (Black and Blue, 1971)
 Boss Man of the Blues (1973)
 The Bosses (Pablo, 1974) with Count Basie
 The Trumpet Kings Meet Joe Turner (Pablo, 1975) with Dizzy Gillespie, Roy Eldridge, Harry "Sweets" Edison and Clark Terry
 Nobody in Mind (Pablo, 1976) with Roy Eldridge and Milt Jackson
 In the Evening (Pablo, 1976)
 Things That I Used to Do (Pablo, 1977)
 Everyday I Have the Blues (Pablo, 1978) with Pee Wee Crayton and Sonny Stitt
 Really the Blues (Big Town, 1978)
 I'm Gonna Sit Right Down and Write Myself a Letter (Spivey 1978)
 Midnight Special (Pablo, 1980)
 Have No Fear Joe Turner Is Here (Pablo, 1981)
 The Very Best of Big Joe Turner Live (Quicksilver, 1982)
 Roll Me Baby (Intermedia, 1982)
 Boss Blues Live! (Intermedia, 1982)
 Blues Train with Roomful of Blues (Muse, 1983)
 Life Ain't Easy (Pablo, 1983)
 Kansas City Here I Come (Pablo, 1984)
 Patcha, Patcha, All Night Long with Jimmy Witherspoon (Pablo, 1985)
 Big Joe Turner with Knocky Parker and His House Rockers (Southland, 1985)
 Flip, Flop and Fly with Count Basie (Pablo, 1989)
 Stormy Monday (Pablo, 1991)
 Buck Clayton Meets Joe Turner (Black Lion, 1992)
 Shake, Rattle & Roll (Tomato, 2003)
 Live at the Music Machine 1983 (RockBeat, 2013)

Singles

Bibliography
 The Encyclopedia of Jazz and Blues. .
 Jumpin' the Blues, Joe Turner with Pete Johnson's Orchestra. Liner notes. Arhoolie Records.
 Rocks in My Bed, Big Joe Turner. Liner notes. International Music.
 The Chronological Joe Turner, 1949–1950. Liner notes. Classics Records.
 Rock and Roll, Big Joe Turner. Liner notes. Atlantic Records.
 Shout, Rattle and Roll, Big Joe Turner. Liner notes. Proper Records (four-CD boxed set), 2005.
 I'm Gonna Sit Right Down and Write Myself a Letter, Big Joe Turner. Liner notes. Spivey Records, 1977.

References

1911 births
1985 deaths
Musicians from Kansas City, Missouri
American blues singers
American jazz singers
Swing singers
Atlantic Records artists
Kent Records artists
Muse Records artists
RPM Records (United States) artists
Savoy Records artists
Vocalion Records artists
Jazz musicians from Missouri
Pablo Records artists
Black & Blue Records artists
EmArcy Records artists
Arhoolie Records artists
Alligator Records artists
Southland Records artists
Flying Dutchman Records artists
Jewel Records artists
20th-century African-American male singers
Rock and roll musicians